Ishan Morris, also known by his stage name iSH, is a Canadian actor and singer. In his acting roles he is also credited at times as Ish Morris.

Acting career
After graduation, Morris launched an acting career where he started appearing in commercials, films, and TV shows. He starred in the television series "Soul" alongside Keshia Chanté. He also landed a recurring role in The Family Channel's series "Baxter" and had a role in Saw 3D, the last film of the Saw horror franchise.

Musical career
The first single that Morris released, "Falling in Love With You", made it to the top 40 on Canadian radio and mediabase charts. He released the mixtape The Name is iSH, accompanied by his single "Priceless" off his debut album The First Impression, on Northern Heights Records. A music video was also released for "Priceless", directed by Grandson and Son and shot in the Cayman Islands.

Morris has worked with artists such as Cory Lee, Robyn, and La Roux. In 2013, he released the single "Rollin'" featuring Stef Lang. After that success, he was featured in Cody Simpsons hit "Pretty Brown Eyes". In 2014 "Light Up", featuring Daniel Richter the lead singer of Eleven Past One. was included in iSH's EP Up & Up on Warner Music Canada. He is also featured on the Faber Drive single, "Candy Store".

Discography

Albums
2011: The First Impression [Northern Heights Records]
Track list:

"Body Language" (3:46)
"Cocktail Waitress" (2:59)
"Come Get It" (3:13)
"Cut to the Chase" (3:45)
"Falling In Love With You" (3:39)
"Gotta Go" (3:52)
"Innocent" (3:34)
"Seize the Day" (3:39)
"Trippin on My Words" (3:53)
"Priceless" (3:28)
"The Name Is iSH" (2:41)
"This Goes Out" (3:38)

Mixtapes
2010: The Name Is iSH
Track list

"Heaven Anyway" (2:24) – (Produced by Pretty Lights) 
"Brick by Brick" (4:00) – (Produced by Spadez)
"Hustle to Be Free" (feat. Tunng) (3:32)
"Cocktail Waitress" (2:58)
"Cobrastyle" (Remix) (feat. Robyn) (2:49)
"How You Like Me Now?" (2:52) – (Produced by Mikey Bo)
"Tonight's The Night" (feat. Cory Lee) (3:44) – (Produced by HWB)
"My Way" (feat. Mateo Jordache) (3:17)
"Thanks for Nothing" (3:19) – (Produced by Bezo)
"The Name is iSH" (2:41) – (Produced by Don Diablo)
"It Is What It Is" (3:10)
"Streets Are Getting Hot" (2:50)
"Still The Same" (feat. Naya Marie) (4:08) – (Produced by Bezo)
"Feelin Myself" (2:23)
"Seizures" (2:36) – (Cuts by Dj Greedo)
"Bulletproof" (Remix) (feat. La Roux) (3:27)
"No Struggle" (4:06) – (Produced by Cylla)
"Seize the Day" (feat. Cory Lee) (3:39) – (Produced by Bezo)

2012: (THR3MIX) 
Track list
"Demons" feat. e-dubble (2:28)
"Never Gonna Let You Go"  with Esthero (3:20)
"End of the Story" (4:02)
"Dreamer (3:43)
"So Long" (3:10)

EPs
2014: Up & Up
Track list
"I'm Home" (3:11)
"Rebel" (feat. Faber) (3:13)
"Rollin'" (feat. Stef Lang) (3:19)
"You Got It" (3:12)
"Renegades" (4:34)
"Light Up" (feat. Daniel Richter) (2:53)
"Happy When It's Gone" (3:35)

Singles

Collaborations
His single "Falling in Love With You" features Cory Lee
"CobraStyle" recording features Robyn
iSH has made a remix of La Roux song "Bulletproof" under the title "Bulletproof (The Remix)" by iSH feat. La Roux
"Candy Store" by Faber Drive featuring iSH (604 Records, 2012)
His single "Rollin'" features Stef Lang
His single "Light Up" features Daniel Richter
He collaborated with rapper E-Dubble for his song Make Like a Tree

Filmography

2000: Cul de sac (short) as a squirt
2002: Conviction (TV movie) as a gangster
2003: 1-800-Missing (TV series) (1 episode "Basic Training" as bag boy)
2008: ReGenesis (TV series) (1 episode "Unbottled" as a terrorist)
2009: Soul (TV series) (5 episodes) as Malcolm in episodes: "My Way", "Fathers and Daughters", "Seducing Spirits", "Twice" and "Stepping Through Doors"
2009: The Border (TV series) (1 episode, "Missing in Action" as Sgt. Fred James) -- credited as Ish Morris
2010: Baxter (TV series) (in 3 episodes "Cry Me a River", "Dance Craze-Y" and "Mock vs Rock" as Mr Fellini)
2010: Harriet the Spy: Blog Wars (TV movie) as TV Host -- credited as Ish Morris
2010: Saw 3D (Movie) as Alex
2012: My Babysitter's a Vampire (TV series) (1 episode "Welcome Back Dusker" as Vampire Thug #1)
2012: Transporter: The Series (TV Series) (1 episode "Payback" as Anton)
2013: Defiance (TV Series) (2 episodes " The Devil in the Dark" and "If I Ever Leave This World Alive" as Rathus)
2014: RoboCop (Movie) (as Armed Sentry at Decrepit House)
2015: Riftworld Chronicles (TV Mini-Series) (8 episodes as Khaleesh)
2015: Dark Matter (TV Series) (1 episode "1.6" as Rebel #1)
2015: Degrassi: Don't Look Back (TV Movie) (as Abe) 
2015: Lost Girl (TV Series) (1 episode "Rise" as Police Officer) 
2016: The Girlfriend Experience (TV Series) (2 episodes "Blindsided" , "Available" as Paramedic) 
2016: Private Eyes (TV Series) (1 episode "Mise en Place" as Young Cop) 
2016: Suits (TV Series) (1 episode "Quid Pro Quo" as Russell) 
2017: The Handmaid's Tale (TV Series) (1 episode "Nolite Te Bastardes Carborundorum" as Guardian Nurse) 
2017: Arrow (TV Series) (1 episode "Missing" as A.R.G.U.S. Guard #1) 
2017: Zoo (TV Series) (1 episode "Wham, Bam, Thank You Sam" as Paramedic) 
2017: Supernatural (TV Series) (1 episode "Lost and Found" as Conrad) 
2017: (Movie) (as Mike) 
2018: iZombie (TV Series) (1 episode "Brainless in Seattle, Part 2" as Erik) 
2018: The Expanse (TV Series) (1 episode "IFF" as UN Deputy) 
2018: Taken (TV Series) (1 episode "ACGT" as Marco) 
2018: Killjoys (TV Series) (5 episodes "Johnny Dangerously" , "Bro-d Trip" , "Greening Pains" , O Mother, Where Art Thou" , "The Kids Are Alright" as Weej) 
2018: The Christmas Chronicles (Movie) (as Thug#1) 
2019: In the Dark (TV Series) (1 episode "I Woke Up Like This" as Police Officer) 
2019: Batwoman (TV Series) (2 episodes "Pilot" , "The Rabbit Hole" as Crows Agent Vasquez/Crows Agent #2) 
2019: Titans (TV Series) (1 episode "Fallen" as Caleb) 
2019: Larry (Movie) (Mateo's Dad)

Awards / Nominations
In 2009, nominated for "Best Urban Single" at the Canadian Radio Music Awards for the single "Falling in Love With You"

References

External links
 
 
 
 
iSH MySpace

Year of birth missing (living people)
Place of birth missing (living people)
Living people
Black Canadian male actors
21st-century Black Canadian male singers
Canadian hip hop singers
Canadian male television actors